Siegfried Engfer (27 April 1915 – missing April 1946)  was a German Luftwaffe fighter pilot during World War II and a recipient of the Knight's Cross of the Iron Cross of Nazi Germany.  He was credited with 58 victories, in over 348 missions.

Engfer went missing on a train journey from Vienna to Munich in April 1946.

Summary of career

Aerial victory claims
According to US historian David T. Zabecki, Engfer was credited with 58 aerial victories. Mathews and Foreman, authors of Luftwaffe Aces — Biographies and Victory Claims, researched the German Federal Archives and found documentation for 58 aerial victory claims, all of which confirmed and claimed on the Eastern Front.

Awards

 Honor Goblet of the Luftwaffe on 21 September 1942 as Feldwebel and pilot
 Knight's Cross of the Iron Cross on 2 October 1942 as Feldwebel and pilot in the III./Jagdgeschwader 3 "Udet"

See also
List of people who disappeared

References

Citations

Bibliography

 
 
 
 
 
 
 
 

1915 births
1940s missing person cases
1946 deaths
German World War II flying aces
Luftwaffe pilots
Missing person cases in Austria
People from Drawsko County
People from the Province of Pomerania
Railway accident deaths in Austria
Railway accident deaths in Germany
Recipients of the Knight's Cross of the Iron Cross